The 1989 Dwars door België was the 44th edition of the Dwars door Vlaanderen cycle race and was held on 23 March 1989. The race started and finished in Waregem. The race was won by Dirk De Wolf.

General classification

References

1989
1989 in road cycling
1989 in Belgian sport
March 1989 sports events in Europe